Ballater is a village in Aberdeenshire, Scotland, on the River Dee, immediately east of the Cairngorm Mountains. It is home to more than 1400 inhabitants and has had a long connection with the British Royal Family.

History

The medieval pattern of development along this reach of the River Dee was influenced by the ancient trackways across the Grampian Mounth, which determined strategic locations of castles and other Deeside settlements of the Middle Ages.

In the early 14th century, the area was part of the estates of the Knights of St John, but the settlement did not develop until around 1770; first as a spa resort to accommodate visitors to the Pannanich Mineral Well, then later upon the arrival of the railway in 1866 it was visited by many tourists taking advantage of the easier access thus afforded. The Victoria and Albert Halls, opposite the railway station, were completed in 1895.

Ballater railway station, the former terminus of the Deeside Railway, was closed in 1966, but remains in use as a visitor centre with an exhibition recording the village's royal connection. Many buildings date from the Victorian era and the centre of the village is a conservation area. The old visitor centre was substantially damaged by fire in May 2015 but has subsequently been restored and reopened.

Glenmuick Church
After the bridge over the River Dee had been built the village developed with a "Centrical Church" replacing the churches at Tullich, Glengairn and Foot o' Gairn which had become ruins.

A foundation stone was laid in 1798 and the first service was held on 14 December 1800. The church was designed by Mr Massey of Aberdeen and cost £670. Doors, at the east and west ends, each had a stair leading to a gallery. The building had four windows at the front and two gable windows, all glazed with plain glass. In the interior was a pulpit, a sound board, a latron and stair and rail. In 1879 a clock was manufactured by Messrs Gillett & Brand of Croydon; the winding mechanism was electrified in 1982. A vestry was added in the early 1850s.

Royal connection
Victoria Barracks is used by the Royal Guard for the castle.

For decades, local stores had Royal Warrants bestowed upon them. Five years after the death of Queen Elizabeth The Queen Mother, who had granted them, the warrants lapsed and, to the chagrin of many townsfolk and especially shop owners, they were not renewed. Shops which still display the arms marking the royal warrant include the butchers, H. M. Sheridan.

In September 2022, following the death of Queen Elizabeth II, the cortège bearing her coffin passed through the village, on its way to Edinburgh.

Climate

Like the most of Scotland and the British Isles, Ballater experiences a maritime climate with cool summers and mild winters. Its upland position means temperatures throughout the year are cooler than lower-lying areas, and snowfall more plentiful during winter months.

Attractions
Ballater is a centre for tourism in Royal Deeside, with the Cairngorms and Balmoral Castle nearby. There are two bike hire shops in the village.

The old Ballater station, containing Queen Victoria's waiting room, was for many years a visitor centre with a replica royal carriage. However, the building was almost completely destroyed by fire in 2015. The rebuilding of the station, bistro and adjoining visitor centre was undertaken and subsequently completed in Autumn 2018. Balmoral Castle is a 10-minute drive from the village.

There are many walks from the village. For the easy going walker, there is Craigendarroch, a small, peculiarly shaped hill near the village. About 12 km (7 miles) south-west of Ballater is Loch Muick. From there experienced walkers can head up the prominent mountain, Lochnagar. Ballater is the home of many challenging walks due to the abundance of Munroes in the area.

There are many well-mapped cycle routes from Ballater into the surrounding areas, including the Deeside Way and a number of popular mountain biking trails. The forests at Cambus o'May have trails for experienced riders.

The River Dee flows through Ballater, and is famous for salmon fishing. 
 
Events in the town include:
The Ballater Walking Festival each May attracts many hillwalkers of all levels. Participants are guided through the hills and valleys of the eastern Cairngorms.
The Ballater Boules Challenge, on alternate Sundays from November to March each year, provides an alternative sport when the weather is not cold enough for the traditional game of curling.
Victoria Week, held annually in August, is a celebration of Ballater's connection with Queen Victoria and Balmoral Castle.

The village has its own 'tongue in cheek', on-line newspaper, the Ballater Bugle.

Recently five Ballater residents refurbished the Automobile Association's Patrol Box at Cambus o'May, one of only an estimated 8 to 10 such historical call boxes remaining in situ in Great Britain.

Transport
There is a bus garage located near to the village centre which provides an hourly public service to Aberdeen's Union Square bus station. The bus company was granted permission to build a new site at Pannanich Road in December 2014.  In April 2015 the bus station was re-opened as a Co-op supermarket.

Notable residents
 Sir Patrick Geddes (1854–1932), biologist and botanist

Government
 In local government Ballater and Crathie share a combined Community council of 13 members.
 In the UK House of Commons it is represented by the County constituency of West Aberdeenshire and Kincardine. 
 In the Scottish Parliament it is represented by the County constituency of Aberdeenshire West.

See also 
 Aboyne, a village,  to the east, along the A93
 List of burghs in Scotland

References

External links

Official website at visitballater.com
Ballater information guide at Aberdeenshisre, Scotland
Ballater tourism guide at myvoyagescotland.com

 
Towns in Aberdeenshire